Phronima is a genus of small, deep sea hyperiid amphipods of the family Phronimidae. It is found throughout the world's oceans, except in polar regions. Phronima species live in the pelagic zone of the deep ocean. Their bodies are semitransparent. Although commonly known as parasites, they are more technically correctly called parasitoids. Instead of constantly feeding on a live host, females attack salps, using their mouths and claws to eat the animal and hollow out its gelatinous shell. Phronima females then enter the barrel and lay their eggs inside, and then propels the barrel through the water as the larvae develop, providing them with fresh food and water.

Classification

The genus Phronima contains these species:
Phronima atlantica 
Phronima bowmani  
Phronima bucephala  
Phronima colletti Bovallius, 1887
Phronima curvipes Vosseler, 1901
Phronima dunbari  
Phronima pacifica Streets, 1887
Phronima sedentaria (Forsskål, 1775) (type species)
Phronima solitaria Guérin-Méneville, 1836
Phronima stebbingi Vosseler, 1901

References

External links
Google search for images of Phronima

Hyperiidea
Crustacean genera
Taxa named by Pierre André Latreille